Bahia is a small genus of perennial flowering plants in the family Asteraceae. The common name is also bahia. It is named in honor of the Spanish botanist Juan Francisco Bahí (1775–1841).

The genus has a disjunct distribution in the southwestern United States, northern Mexico, Guatemala, and Chile, and is found in dry areas.

 Species
 Bahia absinthifolia – hairyseed bahia - USA (Arizona Utah New Mexico Texas); Mexico (Tamaulipas, Nuevo León, Coahuila, Chihuahua, San Luis Potosí, Querétaro, Hidalgo, Durango, Aguascalientes)
 Bahia ambrosioides - Chile incl. Juan Fernández Islands
 Bahia aristata - Mexico
 Bahia autumnalis - Nuevo León
 Bahia bigelovii – Bigelow's bahia - western Texas, Coahuila
 Bahia biternata – slim-lobe bahia - Arizona, New Mexico, Chihuahua
 Bahia depauperata - Guatemala
 Bahia glandulosa - Chihuahua, Durango
 Bahia pedata – blunt-scale bahia - Texas, New Mexico, Durango
 Bahia pringlei - Coahuila, Hidalgo, Querétaro, San Luis Potosí, Veracruz
 Bahia schaffneri - Nuevo León, Hidalgo, San Luis Potosí, Zacatecas
 Bahia xylopoda - Hidalgo, Jalisco, Puebla, San Luis Potosí

References

 
Asteraceae genera